#martyisdead  is a Czech thriller webseries that was released on 20 October 2019 Mall.TV. It was created in cooperation with CZ.NIC, filmed by the Czech company Bionaut. It deals with cyberbullying and was inspired by real events. It won the main prize at the Serial Killer festival, where it premiered. In September 2020, #martyisdead was historically the first Czech series to be nominated for an international Emmy Award, in the category of Short-Form Series. The series won the award in November. In March 2021, he won the Czech Lion Award for the Extraordinary achievement in the field of audiovisual.

Cast
Jakub Nemčok as Martin „Marty“ Biederman
Jan Grundman as Petr Biederman, Marty's father
Petra Bučková as Alena Biedermanová, Marty's mother
Sára Korbelová as Kristýna, Marty's girlfriend
Matěj Havelka as Kryštof, Marty's friend
Andrej Polák as Marty's teacher
Jan Zadražil as a van driver
Klára Miklasová as secretary
Tomáš Bambušek as criminalist

References

External links

2010s Czech television series
Czech crime television series
Czech drama television series
Czech thriller television series
2019 Czech television series debuts
Works about cyberbullying
Emmy Award-winning programs
Czech Lion Awards winners (television series)
MALL.TV original programming
Works about suicide
Czech web series